Charaxes phaeus, the demon emperor or dusky charaxes, is a butterfly of the family Nymphalidae. It is found in southern Africa. (Uganda, Tanzania, Malawi, Zambia , Mozambique,
Zimbabwe, Botswana, South Africa)

Description
The wingspan is 48–56 mm in males and 50–60 mm in females.
Very similar to Charaxes etheocles but forewing above with postdiscal spots only in cellules 3—7 
In males of Charaxes vansoni the two subapical spots on the forewing upperside are blue,
whereas in Charaxes phaeus they are white and the ground colour of the hindwing underside is pale coppery brown, with the silvery sheen comparatively reduced, extending only from the base along the costa and cell   The male differs from that of Charaxes fionae in the paler underside, 
larger greenish spots on the upperside, and wider pale wing margins. 
In f. coryndoni Rothsch. the postdiscal spots of the forewing are all present, those in la and lb joined to the blue basal area; forewing with small blue marginal spots; marginal streaks of the hindwing thick and greenish. Under surface with reddish grey ground-colour and weakly marked. Zambesi

Biology
It flies year-round, with peaks from February to May and in spring. The habitat consists of thornbush savanna (thornbush = Vachellia) andBrachystegia woodland (Miombo. 

The larvae feed on Acacia nigrescens, Amblygonocarpus andongensis, Erythrophleum africanum, and Tamarindus indica.

Notes on the biology of phaeus are given by Kielland (1990) and Pringle et al (1994) <ref>Kielland, J. 1990 Butterflies of Tanzania. Hill House, Melbourne and London: 1-363.</refApollo Books, Svendborg, Denmark: 1-595</ref>

Taxonomy
Charaxes phaeus is a member of the large species group Charaxes etheocles

References

External links
Images of C. phaeus Royal Museum for Central Africa (Albertine Rift Project)
Charaxes phaeus images at Consortium for the Barcode of Life

Butterflies described in 1877
phaeus
Butterflies of Africa
Taxa named by William Chapman Hewitson